Hasina Jalal (Persian: حسینه جلال) is an advocate for women's rights and democracy in Afghanistan. In 2014, Jalal was elected by public vote to receive the "N-Peace Award" from the UNDP Asia Pacific Regional Office and the UN Secretary General's Special Advisor on the University for Peace. In 2012, she co-founded the National Association of Afghanistan Civil Society with the membership of more than 50 non-profit and non-governmental organizations in Afghanistan. She has strived to raise the voices of Afghan women and girls in various regional and international platforms and has co-founded the first alliance of South Asian women on women's economic, social, and culture rights in Sri Lanka. In her last position at the government of Afghanistan, she was heading the international donors' funded programs and initiatives to the mines, oil, and gas sectors of Afghanistan.

Biography
Hasina Jalal has obtained her undergraduate degree in economics with a minor in political science from the Jamia Millia Islamia (JMI)--a Central University in India—as an ICCR scholar. Before joining the JMI University, she had studied economics at the Kabul University for one academic year. She has a Master of Business Administration from the American University of Afghanistan and MA in Women's and Gender Studies from the University of Northern Iowa as a Fulbright scholar. She has been affiliated as a Fellow with the Georgetown University. She is a PhD candidate in Public and International Affairs at the Graduate School of Public and International Affairs.

Jalal has been involved in the finding and managing of several civil society organizations in Afghanistan and at the South Asian regional level. In 2012, she co-founded the National Association of Afghanistan Civil Society with the membership of more than 50 non-profit and non-governmental organizations. She has represented Afghanistan in various regional and international platforms and has co-founded the first alliance of South Asian women on women's economic, social, and culture rights in Sri Lanka. Hasina has given talks and participated in panel discussions in U.S.'s top universities such as Princeton University, Columbia University, University of Chicago, Georgetown University, American University, and so on, and by doing so, she has raised the voices of Afghan girls and women, has strived to promote human rights and democracy, and has challenged the institutionalized and normalized inequities and injustices including gender based inequities in Afghanistan. She is the co-founder of the Afghanistan Women Empowerment and Capacity Building Center and the South Asian Women's Coalition for Cooperation.

Jalal has served in the government of Afghanistan as a Research Team Lead at the Presidential Palace where she led a team of researchers, conducted policy-oriented research, and presented findings and recommendations to the President of Afghanistan. She also worked as a Policy Advisor and Director of Program Design and Donor Coordination Directorate at the Ministry of Mines and Petroleum of Afghanistan. In this role, among other things, she oversaw the management and implementation of all projects, programs, and initiatives funded by foreign aid to the oil, gas, and mining sectors of Afghanistan, and provided policy advice to the Minister. She has taught economics to the bachelor of business administration students in several Kabul based universities.

Hasina efforts and activism for gender equality, human rights, women's empowerment, and democracy has been recognized by several regional and international awards and honors: In 2012, Asian Rural Women’s Coalitions (ARWC) recognized her efforts with the "Honoring 100 Asian Women Award". In 2014, she was elected by public vote to receive the "N-Peace Award" from the UNDP Asia Pacific Regional Office and the UN Secretary General's Special Advisor on the University for Peace. In 2016, she has received the "Global Women Leadership Award" by the World-CSR and in 2017, she received the "World Super Achiever Award" by World Human Rights Congress. In 2020, she was awarded the "Iconic Women Creating a Better World for All Award" by the Women's Economic Forum, and in the same year, the Afghan public voted for her to be elected as one of the "45 Most Influential Afghan Women".

She is fluent in Persian, Pashto, English, Turkish, Hindi and Urdu, and somewhat fluent in Punjabi, Arabic, and Uzbek languages.

References

Living people
Date of birth missing (living people)
21st-century Afghan women
Afghan women activists
Year of birth missing (living people)